Tokyo Gakugei University (東京学芸大学, Tōkyō gakugei daigaku) is a national university in Koganei, Tokyo. Founded in 1873, it was chartered as a university in 1949. It is also known as Gakudai (学大) and TGU, for short.

In addition to its Koganei campus, it also maintains a number of attached public schools offering curricula in elementary, secondary, and special education at various locations in the greater Tokyo area. The university has a strong reputation in education-related fields, playing a national role in the development of educational policy and innovations in teacher education.

History 
Tokyo Gakugei University was founded in 1873. It was formally chartered as a university in 1949 through the merging of four teacher-training institutions.

In 1966, the Graduate School of Tokyo Gakugei University was established, and since 1996 it has offered Doctoral degrees in the education field as part of a coalition of educational institutions that include Chiba University, Saitama University, and Yokohama National University.

In recent years, Tokyo Gakugei University has developed programs to better accommodate professional school teachers, including evening and short-term courses. The university also houses a number of national research centres in education-related fields.

Faculties 

A Course: The department of Elementary school's teacher training
B Course: The department of Junior high school and high school's teacher training
C Course: The department of Special school's teacher training
L Course: The department of Long-Life Studying
N Course: The department of Human Welfare Studying
K Course: The department of International Understanding and Education
F Course: The department of Environmentalogy
J Course: The department of Information Studying
G Course: The department of Art and Cultural Studies

Notable alumni and affiliates
Keiko Abe, marimbist
Mamoru Oshii, filmmaker
Ichiro Saito, conductor
Satoko Inoue, pianist
David Hebert, musician/musicologist
Eric Van Hove, contemporary artist
Yasuko Muramatsu, president (2010 to 2014)
Yoshiyuki Yoshida, Judoka/professional mixed martial artist

References

External links 

Tokyo Gakugei University
Official English Website
Music Education Department, Tokyo Gakugei University

 
Japanese national universities
Western Tokyo
Teachers colleges in Japan
Educational institutions established in 1873
1873 establishments in Japan
Koganei, Tokyo
Universities and colleges in Tokyo